Violeta Ivković (Serbian-Cyrillic: Виолета Ивковић; born 1957 in Belgrade) is a Serbian journalist and writer.

Biography
Violeta Ivković studied at the Faculty of English Language and Literature of the prestigious and traditional University of Oxford and after completing her studies, she started a journalistic career specialized in new information and communications technologies. The mother of three children worked as journalist for many years and wrote numerous articles for magazines such as Mikro PC World, SciTech and Com&GSM. She is author of many contributions to Zoran Modli’s radio shows Modulacije and Zair. She has long since retired, but continues to be lecturer of annual Workshop for Creative Writing (Radionica za kreativnog pisanja „PričArt”), initiated by Zoran Zivković and first held in 2011.

The first work Friends is an email diary and includes the period from March to June 1999 during NATO bombing of Yugoslavia and its prologue states: This is an electronic diary that puts up with our thoughts, fears, feelings, events that we are unable to tell those closest to us for many understandable reasons. The latest novel The Blogger tells about the teenager Anna, who writes a blog expressing her feelings, desires and dreams. She lives with her Mom and sister, her parents are divorced, but Dad is often visiting them. The teen misses the time when they all still lived together. An English version of Friends was published by herself on Scribd and an English excerpt from the novel The Island is available on the website of the magazine  Words Without Borders. A Serbian selection of her articles of the magazine Mikro PC World can be read online on the website of Zoran Modli. Ivković's latest book The Blogger has become her most successful book to date with two editions.

Awards
Ivković is laureate of the Mali Nemo Award 2009 for her novel Dining Room.

Works
Moji su drugovi (Friends), self-publication, Todra printing, Belgrade 1999.
Život u ljubičastom: internet priče (Life in Purple: stories from the internet), self-publication, Todra, Belgrade 2001.
Trpezarija (Dining Room), Mali Nemo, Pančevo 2009, .
Ogrizak noći (The Scrap of the Night), Udruženje građanja Čekić, Belgrade 2010, .
Ostrvo (The Island), Polaris, Belgrade 2013, .
Blogerka (The Blogger), Klett, Belgrade 2018, .
Beton (Concrete), Psychological thriller, Makart, Belgrade 2019, .

References

1957 births
Living people
Journalists from Belgrade
21st-century Serbian women writers
Writers from Belgrade